The Simon Van Duyne House is a historic house located at 58 Maple Avenue in the Pine Brook section of the township of Montville in Morris County, New Jersey. The oldest section was built . It was documented by the Historic American Buildings Survey in 1936. The house was later added to the National Register of Historic Places on January 17, 1992, for its significance in architecture. The house was also listed as part of the Dutch Stone Houses in Montville, New Jersey Multiple Property Submission (MPS).

History and description
In 1787, James Van Duyne purchased  from the estate of Robert Sandford Sr. and in 1789, gave it to his son Simon Van Duyne. According to the nomination form, the oldest section of the house may have been built by Sandford .

The house is constructed using sandstone in the vernacular architectural style of the Dutch stone houses in the area.

See also
 National Register of Historic Places listings in Morris County, New Jersey
 List of the oldest buildings in New Jersey

References

External links
 
 

Montville, New Jersey
Houses in Morris County, New Jersey
Houses on the National Register of Historic Places in New Jersey
National Register of Historic Places in Morris County, New Jersey
1750 establishments in New Jersey
New Jersey Register of Historic Places
Historic American Buildings Survey in New Jersey
Stone houses in New Jersey